Folke Frithiof Martens Mårtensson (19 May 1884 – 20 June 1956) was a Greco-Roman wrestler from Sweden. He won the middleweight contests at the 1908 Summer Olympics in London and at the unofficial 1909 European Championships in Malmö.

After 1909 Mårtensson moved to Copenhagen for training as a dental technician and in 1913 to the United States. Two years later he returned to Stockholm, where he died in 1956.

References

External links
 

1884 births
1956 deaths
Olympic wrestlers of Sweden
Wrestlers at the 1908 Summer Olympics
Swedish male sport wrestlers
Olympic gold medalists for Sweden
Olympic medalists in wrestling
Medalists at the 1908 Summer Olympics